Simon Katz (born 16 May 1971) is an English songwriter and multi-instrumentalist, best known for his work with the band Jamiroquai from 1995 to 2000. Katz was a recipient of the Grammy Award for Best Pop Performance by a Duo Or Group With Vocal for Jamiroquai's "Virtual Insanity" in 1997, and the Ivor Novello Award for Outstanding Song Collection with Jamiroquai in 1999.

Career

Jamiroquai, 1995–2000
Katz joined Jamiroquai in 1995, remaining as a member until 2000. He was the band's guitarist on Travelling Without Moving (1996), which won a Grammy Award and four MTV Video Music Awards, and its follow-up, Synkronized (1999).

Gorillaz, 2001–2002
In 2001, Katz joined Damon Albarn's group Gorillaz, an animated quartet with actual musicians providing the voice and instruments for the animated "band members." During live performances and on the 2002 remix album Laika Come Home, he played guitar as the character of Noodle, a 14-year-old Japanese schoolgirl and guitar prodigy. Katz was featured in the 2008 film Bananaz, which documents the development of the Gorillaz band from 2000 to 2006.

For Mali Music, Albarn's project exploring the music of West Africa, Katz performed with Albarn in Mali alongside kora player Toumani Diabaté and guitarist Afel Bocoum.

Other work
From 2002 to 2003, Katz served as musical director for Ms. Dynamite, during which time she won the Mercury Prize for her debut album, A Little Deeper; two Brit Awards, including Best British Female Artist, and three MOBO Awards.

In 2010, Katz co-wrote the ballad "Be Good to Me" for Sia's fifth studio album, We Are Born.

Katz occasionally works in film. He has been featured on the scores for the 2002 film City of God and the 2006 documentary ...More Than 1000 Words, and served as music supervisor on the 2008 film Ball Don't Lie.

Personal life
Katz was born and raised in Nottingham, England. He currently resides in Brooklyn, New York.

Discography

Albums
 Jamiroquai – The Return of the Space Cowboy (1994, Sony)
 Jamiroquai – Travelling Without Moving (1996, Sony)
 Jamiroquai – Synkronized (1999, Sony)
 HKB FiNN – Vitalistics (2002, Son Records)
 Spacemonkeyz vs. Gorillaz – Laika Come Home (2002, Parlaphone)
 E2K – If Not Now (2003, Topic)
 Gemma Fox – Messy (2004, Polydor)
 Mad Professor – Method to the Madness (2005, Sanctuary)
 Jamiroquai – High Times: Singles 1992-2006 (2006, Sony)
 Platinum Pied Pipers – Abundance (2009, Ubiquity)
 Sia – We Are Born (2010, Sony)
 Dazzled Kid – Fire Needs Air (2011, Dazzled Kid Records)
 Sambismo – The Birth Of... (2012)

References

External links
 Official website

English songwriters
English male guitarists
Jamiroquai members
Gorillaz members
1971 births
Living people
People from Nottingham
Grammy Award winners